Sri Lanka–Switzerland relations are the bilateral relations between Sri Lanka and the Switzerland. Diplomatic relations were established in 1956, and mainly encompass economy and cooperation. Sri Lanka has a consulate general in Geneva and Switzerland has an embassy in Colombo.

History
Switzerland immediately recognized Sri Lankan independence from the United Kingdom in 1948, establishing diplomatic relations in 1956. The Federal Council appointed the first ambassador to Colombo in 1968.

Diplomatic relations

In the 1980s political relations between Switzerland and Sri Lanka intensified with many Sri Lankan Tamils fleeing from the ethnic conflict to find asylum in Switzerland.

See also
 Foreign relations of Sri Lanka
 Foreign relations of Switzerland
 2019 Sri Lankan Swiss embassy controversy

References

External links
 Federal Department of Foreign Affairs, Sri Lanka
 Newsletter of the Embassy of Switzerland to Sri Lanka and the Maldives

 
Switzerland
Bilateral relations of Switzerland